Te One is a settlement on the Chatham Islands. It is located in Petre Bay, on the west coast of the main island, just north of the port settlement of Waitangi.

Marae

Whakamaharatanga, a marae (meeting ground) of Ngāti Mutunga, is located in Te One. It includes the Whakamaharatanga wharenui (meeting house).

In October 2020, the New Zealand Government committed $198,318 from the Provincial Growth Fund to upgrade the marae, creating 6 jobs.

Education

It is one of the most isolated schools in New Zealand, which makes it harder for the school to attract teachers and access resources.

References

Populated places in the Chatham Islands
Chatham Island
Populated lakeshore places in New Zealand